The Museum of Popular Arts and Traditions is an art museum located in Algiers, the capital of Algeria. Its displays Algerian art, including rugs, jewellery, pottery and costumes. The museum is housed in a former 16th-century Ottoman palace. The former Turkish residence was formerly known as Dar Bakri.

See also 
 List of museums in Algeria

References

External links 
 https://web.archive.org/web/20110906120104/http://www.musee-mnatp.art.dz/

Ottoman architecture in Algeria
Palaces in Algeria
Museums in Algiers
Art museums and galleries in Algeria
Arab art scene
Folk museums in Africa